Sila or Dar Sila was formerly a department in the Ouaddaï region of Chad.

In 2008 it became part of the new Sila Region which was created from the Ouaddaï region's former Sila and Djourf Al Ahmar (Djourouf Al Ahmar) departments.

The capital of the former department and new region of Sila is Goz Beïda.

See also
 Dar Sila

References 

Former departments of Chad
Ouaddaï Region

bg:Сила (департамент)
da:Sila (Tchad)
fr:Sila (Tchad)